Sarah Edwards (born January 31, 1953) is a Vermont consultant and former member of the Vermont House of Representatives from Brattleboro. She is a member of the Vermont Progressive Party.

She was first elected in 2002, and in 2012 announced that she would not seek re-election, wishing instead to concentrate on her family foundation, the Lighthouse Reef Conservation Institute. She endorsed chef-restaurateur Tristan Toleno as her successor. Toleno did win as a Democrat in the reapportioned district.

She is a former Vice-Chair of the Select Board of Brattleboro.

References

External links 
 Edwards' profile at Vote-Vt.org

1953 births
American consultants
Living people
Members of the Vermont House of Representatives
People from Brattleboro, Vermont
Vermont Progressive Party politicians
Women state legislators in Vermont
21st-century American women politicians